This is an index of lists of virus taxa.

By taxonomic rank
 List of higher virus taxa, i.e. all taxa above the rank of family
 List of virus families and subfamilies
 List of virus genera (also includes subgenera)
 List of virus species